The Rajkot–Somnath line is a railway line connecting Jetalsar and Veraval.

History
The initial section from Veraval to Junagadh was started in 1880 by Junagadh Railway and opened to traffic in 1888. The line between Rajkot to Jetalsar was started in 1880 by Rajkot–Jetalsar Railway and opened to traffic in 1890. Rajkot-Junagadh-Veraval section was merged with Saurashtra Railway in April 1948. Saurashtra Railway was merged into Western Railway on 5 November 1951. Gauge conversion of Rajkot–Veraval section was announced in 1996-97. Gauge conversion of Rajkot–Veraval has been completed in 2003.

References

1890 establishments in India
Railway lines opened in 1890
5 ft 6 in gauge railways in India

Western Railway zone
Railway lines in Gujarat